Sonia Vettenburg (born 12 November 1954) is a Belgian sports shooter. She competed in the women's 10 metre air pistol event at the 1992 Summer Olympics. Vettenburg, who is a wheelchair user, also competed at the 1984 Summer Paralympics and the 1988 Summer Paralympics.

See also
 List of athletes who have competed in the Paralympics and Olympics

References

1954 births
Living people
Belgian female sport shooters
Olympic shooters of Belgium
Shooters at the 1992 Summer Olympics
Sportspeople from Aalst, Belgium
Paralympic competitors for Belgium
Shooters at the 1984 Summer Paralympics
Shooters at the 1988 Summer Paralympics
20th-century Belgian women